Karl Joseph Graf Hadik von Futak (28 October 1756 in Lőcse – 24 July 1800 in Alessandria) was an Austrian cavalry soldier and commander of Hungarian origin during the War of the Bavarian Succession, Austro-Turkish War (1787–1791), and French Revolutionary Wars. He was mortally wounded at Marengo, where he commanded the center column.

References
 Article in Constantin von Wurzbach: Biographisches Lexikon des Kaiserthums Oesterreich, Bd. 7, S. 170f., Wien 1861.
 David Hollins, Marengo 1800: Napoleon’s Day of Fate. Oxford 2000
 Digby Smith, Charge: Great Cavalry Charges of Napoleonic Wars. London 2003

Counts of Austria
Hungarian soldiers
Military leaders of the French Revolutionary Wars
Karl
1756 births
1800 deaths
Commanders Cross of the Military Order of Maria Theresa